Mercator is a lunar impact crater that is located on the southwestern edge of Mare Nubium, in the southwest part of the Moon. It was named after 16th-century Southern Dutch cartographer Gerardus Mercator. It is located to the southeast of the crater Campanus, and the two are separated by a narrow, winding valley.

The Rupes Mercator fault is tangential with the northeastern outer rim of Mercator. The eastern edge of Palus Epidemiarum reaches the west rim of Mercator, and a rille from the Rimae Ramsden reaches the western rim at the site of the craterlet Mercator C.

The rim of Mercator is only somewhat eroded, and several tiny craterlets lie on the west and eastern rims. The interior floor has been flooded by lava in the past, leaving a relatively smooth and featureless surface.

Satellite craters

By convention these features are identified on lunar maps by placing the letter on the side of the crater midpoint that is closest to Mercator.

References

 
 
 
 
 
 
 
 
 
 
 

Impact craters on the Moon